De Decker is a Dutch occupational surname meaning "the thatcher". A variant spelling is De Dekker. In West Flanders the name is usually agglutinated to Dedecker. People with this name include:

De Decker / De Dekker
 Armand De Decker (born 1948), Belgian politician
 Ezechiel de Decker (1603/04–1646/47), Dutch surveyor and teacher of mathematics
 Jacob de Decker (1640–1680), Dutch painter active in Italy
 Jeremias de Dekker (c.1610–1666), Dutch poet
 Johannes de Decker (1626–aft.1670), Dutch landowner in New Netherland
 Mike De Decker (born 1995), Belgian darts player
 Pierre de Decker (1812–1891), Prime Minister of Belgium 1855–1857
 Wim De Decker (born 1982), Belgian football player and manager
DeDecker / Dedecker
 Jane DeDecker (born 1961), American sculptor
 Jean-Marie Dedecker (born 1952), Belgian politician, founder of List Dedecker
Mary DeDecker (1909–2000), American botanist, plant collector
 Paul Dedecker (1921–2007), Belgian mathematician
 Peter Dedecker (born 1983), Belgian politician

See also 
 Den Dekker, Dutch surname of the same origin
 Decker (surname), surname of mostly Low German origin
 Dekker, common Dutch surname of the same origin
 Dedecker lupine, plant species named after plant collector Mary DeDecker

References 

Dutch-language surnames
Occupational surnames